Voltage-dependent calcium channel subunit alpha2delta-2 is a protein that in humans is encoded by the CACNA2D2 gene.

This gene encodes a member of the alpha-2/delta subunit family, a protein in the voltage-dependent calcium channel complex. Calcium channels mediate the influx of calcium ions into the cell upon membrane polarization and consist of a complex of alpha-1, alpha-2/delta, beta, and gamma subunits in a 1:1:1:1 ratio. Various versions of each of these subunits exist, either expressed from similar genes or the result of alternative splicing. Research on a highly similar protein in rabbit suggests the protein described in this record is cleaved into alpha-2 and delta subunits. Alternate transcriptional splice variants of this gene, encoding different isoforms, have been characterized.

CACNA2D2 containing channels are blocked by amiodarone.

See also
 Voltage-dependent calcium channel

References

Further reading

External links 
 
 

Ion channels